Defending champion Novak Djokovic defeated Dominic Thiem in the final, 6–4, 4–6, 2–6, 6–3, 6–4 to win the men's singles tennis title at the 2020 Australian Open. It was his record-extending eighth Australian Open title and 17th major title overall. With the win, Djokovic regained the world No. 1 singles ranking, and became the first player since Ken Rosewall to win major titles in three different decades, and the first to do so in the Open Era. The match also marked the first time Djokovic came back to win a major final after trailing two sets to one, having lost each of the last seven times this happened. Thiem became the first Austrian to reach the final. This was Thiem's third major runner-up finish in as many finals.

This was the final Australian Open appearance for six-time champion Roger Federer. With his third-round win, Federer became the first player to win 100 matches at the Australian Open. He also became the first player to have at least 100 wins at two majors (the other being Wimbledon). Federer's semifinal encounter with Djokovic marked their 50th and final professional meeting; Djokovic won to end their head-to-head at 27–23 in his favor.

Seeds
All seedings per ATP rankings.

Draw

Finals

Top half

Section 1

Section 2

Section 3

Section 4

Bottom half

Section 5

Section 6

Section 7

Section 8

Seeded players
The following are the seeded players. Seedings are based on ATP rankings on 13 January 2020, while ranking and points before are as of 20 January 2020. Points after are as of 3 February 2020.

† This column shows either the player's points from the 2019 tournament or his 18th best result (shown in brackets). Only ranking points counting towards the player's ranking as of 13 January 2020 are reflected in the column.

Withdrawn players
The following players would have been seeded, but they withdrew from the event.

Other entry information

Wild cards

Protected ranking

Qualifiers

Lucky losers

Withdrawals

Notes

Championship match ratings
504 thousand on ESPN, in the USA.

References

External links
 Association of Tennis Professionals (ATP) – 2020 Australian Open Men's Singles draw
 2020 Australian Open – Men's draws and results at the International Tennis Federation

Men's Singles
Australian Open (tennis) by year – Men's singles